Anisoditha is a genus of pseudoscorpions in the family Chthoniidae. There is at least one described species in Anisoditha, A. curvidigitata.

Anisoditha was formerly in the family Tridenchthoniidae but was recently moved to the family Chthoniidae.

References

Further reading

 
 
 
 
 

Chthoniidae